A contrafact is a musical composition built using the chord progression of a pre-existing song, but with a new melody and arrangement. Typically the original tune's progression and song form will be reused but occasionally just a section will be reused in the new composition. This article is a list of notable contrafacts by jazz artists.

References

Further reading
 
 
  .

External links
 Searchable Realbook Index at www.seventhstring.co.uk
 Jazz era transition to Bebop: "Hot House" and the revolutionary aspect "Charlie Parker I: – Hot House", article by Bernard Chazelle (Princeton, Collège de France), Sep. 9, 2008

Musical techniques
Jazz contrafacts, list of
Contrafacts